Lajos Somlay (18 February 1924 – 20 March 1962) was a Hungarian equestrian. He competed at the 1956 Summer Olympics and the 1960 Summer Olympics.

References

1924 births
1962 deaths
Hungarian male equestrians
Olympic equestrians of Hungary
Equestrians at the 1956 Summer Olympics
Equestrians at the 1960 Summer Olympics
Sportspeople from Budapest